Ronald "Ronnie" Mather (first ¼ 1927 – 2 October 2011) was an English professional rugby league footballer who played in the 1950s, and coached.

Background
Ronnie Mather's birth was registered in Wigan district, Lancashire, England, he worked as a machinist at the National Coal Board, and later as a mechanical instructor at the NCB Old Boston training centre at Haydock, Lancashire. He died aged 84 in Wigan district, Greater Manchester, England.

Playing career

Championship final appearances
Ronnie Mather played  in Wigan's 13–6 victory over Bradford Northern in the Championship Final during the 1951–52 season at Leeds Road, Huddersfield on Saturday 10 May 1952.

County League appearances
Ronnie Mather played in Wigan's victory in the Lancashire County League during the 1951–52 season .

County Cup Final appearances
Ronnie Mather played  in Wigan's 28–5 victory over Warrington in the 1950–51 Lancashire County Cup Final during the 1950–51 season at Station Road, Swinton, on Saturday 4 November 1950, played  in the 14–6 victory over Leigh in the 1951–52 Lancashire County Cup Final during the 1951–52 season at Station Road, Swinton, on Saturday 27 October 1951, and played  in the 8–16 defeat by St. Helens in the 1953–54 Lancashire County Cup Final during the 1953–54 season at Station Road, Swinton on Saturday 24 October 1953.

Club career
Ronnie Mather made his début for Wigan against Dewsbury at Crown Flatt on Saturday 19 August 1950, and played his last game for Wigan against Whitehaven at Recreation Ground on Saturday 21 September 1957.

Genealogical information
Ronnie Mather's marriage to Elsie (née Smales) was registered during third ¼ 1949 in Wigan district. They had children; Stephen P. Mather (birth registered during third ¼  in Wigan district).

References

External links
Search for "Mather" at rugbyleagueproject.org
Obituary at announce.jpress.co.uk

1927 births
2011 deaths
English rugby league players
Lancashire rugby league team players
Rugby league players from Wigan
Rugby league hookers
Wigan Warriors players